Lamberto Cesari (23 September 1910 – 12 March 1990) was an Italian mathematician naturalized in the United States, known for his work on the theory of surface area, the theory of functions of bounded variation, the theory of optimal control and on the stability theory of dynamical systems: in particular, by extending the concept of Tonelli plane variation, he succeeded in introducing the class of functions of bounded variation of several variables in its full generality.

Biography 
In 1933, he was awarded his laurea degree at the Scuola Normale Superiore in Pisa under the direction of Leonida Tonelli. After a period of study from 1934 to 1935 in Germany at Monaco di Baviera under the direction of Constantin Carathéodory, he went back to Pisa at the Scuola Normale Superiore for a year, and then to Rome at the Istituto Nazionale per le Applicazioni del Calcolo, at the time directed by Mauro Picone.

From 1938 to 1946 he went back as a professore incaricato at Pisa University: in 1947 he was at the University of Bologna as a professor of mathematical analysis.

In 1948 he went to the United States as a visiting professor at the Institute for Advanced Study in Princeton, at Purdue University in Lafayette, at the University of California - Berkeley and at the University of Wisconsin–Madison.

In 1960 he was appointed as a professor of mathematical analysis at the University of Michigan at Ann Arbor where he remained until his retirement in 1981. In 1976 he became a citizen of the United States, while keeping close scientific contacts with the Italian mathematical community.

The Lamberto Cesari chair
The department of Mathematics at the University of Michigan honored the memory of Lamberto Cesari with the creation of a professorship chair.

Work

Research activity 
He is remembered for his achievements on the Plateau's problem, on the theory of parametric minimal surfaces, on Lebesgue measure of continuous and related other variational problems: he also worked in the field of optimal control and studied periodic solutions of systems of nonlinear ordinary differential equations by using methods of nonlinear functional analysis. In the paper  he introduced a generalization of functions of bounded variation to the multi-dimensional setting, now acknowledged as the most versatile of such generalizations.

Selected publications

Papers

Scientific papers
. Available at Numdam. In this paper Cesari extends the now called Tonelli plane variation concept in order to include a subclass of the class of integrable functions.
.

Biographical, historical and survey papers

. 
. 
. "The work of Leonida Tonelli and his influence on scientific thinking in this century" (English translation of the title) is an ample commemorative article, reporting recollections of the Author about teachers and colleagues, and a detailed survey of his and theirs scientific work, presented at the International congress in occasion of the celebration of the centenary of birth of Mauro Picone and Leonida Tonelli (held in Rome on May 6–9, 1985).

Books
. His work summarizing the theory of surface area, including his own contributions.

.

See also 
Bounded variation
Constantin Carathéodory
Mauro Picone
Leonida Tonelli
Total variation

References

Biographical and general references 
. The "Yearbook" of the renowned Italian scientific institution, including an historical sketch of its history, the list of all past and present members as well as a wealth of information about its academic and scientific activities.
. The first part ("Tomo") of an extensive work on the "Accademia di Scienze, Lettere e Arti di Modena", reporting the history of the academy and biographies of members up to the year 2006.
. "The work of Leonida Tonelli and his influence on scientific thinking in this century" (English translation of the title) is an ample commemorative article, reporting recollections of the Author about teachers and colleagues, and a detailed survey of his and theirs scientific work, presented at the International congress in occasion of the celebration of the centenary of birth of Mauro Picone and Leonida Tonelli (held in Rome on May 6–9, 1985).
.
.
.
. A short commemoration surveying Cesari's personality and his ability as a teacher and mentor for new mathematicians: a short survey of his scientific contributions is also given.

Scientific references
A survey of the work of Lamberto Cesari in applied mathematics.

Publications dedicated to him or to his memory
The proceedings of an international conference held to celebrate Lamberto Cesari's 70th birthday.

External links 

PRISTEM bibliography (in Italian).

The Centro Studi Interfacoltà Lamberto Cesari at the University of Perugia, and a biography of Lamberto Cesari (in Italian).

1910 births
1990 deaths
20th-century Italian mathematicians
Institute for Advanced Study visiting scholars
Mathematical analysts
Members of the Lincean Academy
Scientists from Bologna
University of Pisa alumni
Academic staff of the University of Bologna
University of Michigan faculty
Italian emigrants to the United States
Naturalized citizens of the United States